Penn & Teller: Bullshit! is an American documentary television series that aired from 2003 to 2010 on the premium cable channel Showtime. The series premiered on January 24, 2003, and 89 episodes aired over the course of the series in the span of eight seasons, concluding on August 12, 2010.

Series overview

Episodes

Season 1 (2003)

Season 2 (2004)

Season 3 (2005)

Season 4 (2006)

Season 5 (2007)

Season 6 (2008)

Season 7 (2009)

Season 8 (2010)

References

External links
 Episode guide on the show's official website
 Penn & Teller: Bullshit! Episode Guide from tv.com
 Penn & Teller: Bullshit! Episode Guide from epguides.com

Lists of American non-fiction television series episodes
Libertarian television and radio shows